Newry, Mourne and Down is a local government district in Northern Ireland that was created on 1 April 2015 by merging Newry and Mourne District and Down District. It covers most of the southeastern part of Northern Ireland. The local authority is Newry, Mourne and Down District Council.

Geography
It covers the Southeast of Northern Ireland, including southern County Armagh and large parts of County Down. It incorporates all of the Mourne Mountains Area of Outstanding Natural Beauty and has an extensive coastline stretching from Strangford Lough to Carlingford Lough, and border counties Louth and Monaghan in the Republic of Ireland. The name of the new district was announced on 17 September 2008.

Newry, Mourne and Down District Council

Newry, Mourne and Down District Council replaces Newry and Mourne District Council and Down District Council. The first election for the new district council was originally due to take place in May 2009, but in April 2008, Shaun Woodward, Secretary of State for Northern Ireland announced that the scheduled 2009 district council elections were to be postponed until 2011. The first elections took place on 22 May 2014 and the council acted as a shadow authority until 1 April 2015.

References

Districts of Northern Ireland, 2015-present